Kappa Octantis, Latinized from κ Octantis, is a solitary star in the southern circumpolar constellation Octans. It has an apparent magnitude of 5.55, making it visible to the naked eye under ideal conditions.

Kappa Octanits is an Am star, making it difficult to classify. It has been given a stellar classification of A2 mA5-A8, indicating that it is an A2 star with the metallic lines of an A5-A8 star. At present it has 2.07 times the mass of the Sun and 2.75 its radius. Kappa Octantis is said to be around 350 million years old.

Reference

Octans
Am stars
A-type stars
Octantis, Kappa
Octantis, 18
117374
066753
5084
PD-85 384